Oh My Kadavule is a 2020 Indian Tamil-language romantic fantasy film, written and directed by Ashwath Marimuthu on his directorial debut. The film stars Ashok Selvan, Ritika Singh and Vani Bhojan, while Sha Ra and M. S. Bhaskar play supporting roles. Vijay Sethupathi and Ramesh Thilak make extended cameo appearances. The film had its theatrical release on Valentine's Day, 2020. Oh My Kadavule was selected for official screening at International Indian Film Festival in Toronto, held in August 2020. It was remade in Kannada as Lucky Man (2022) and in Telugu as Ori Devuda (2022).

Plot 
Anu, Arjun and Mani are best friends since childhood. During a party to celebrate Arjun clearing his Engineering arrear exams, Anu tells the other two of her father Paulraj looking for a groom for her. She suddenly asks Arjun if he'd like to marry her, to which he agrees. One year later, Anu and Arjun are seen sitting in family court for final hearing to obtain divorce. A man sits behind Arjun and predicts that he won't get his divorce on that day as his wife will faint and be rushed to hospital, then he provides him a visiting card and disappears. To Arjun's shock, all the events predicted by this strange man turn out true and the case is postponed to evening. Arjun rushes to the address mentioned on the visiting card. There, he encounters the man, who introduces himself as God. Arjun explains his problems to God.

Arjun, after marriage, continues to treat Anu as a friend and things are smooth until he starts working in Paulraj's toilet manufacturing factory as a quality control checker. Arjun hates this job, but gets used to it. But he is unable to see Anu as anything more than a friend and is totally bored by the monotony of his life. One day, he meets Meera, his school senior and childhood crush, who now works as an assistant film director. They strike up a friendship, with Meera encouraging Arjun to explore his passion for acting and requesting him to audition for Gautham Vasudev Menon's upcoming film. The audition goes very well, with Arjun impressing the director with his performance. Later at a pub, Meera tells Arjun about her failed film-making attempts and a past break-up. Arjun consoles Meera and hugs her, but this is noticed by Anu, who is already sad at Arjun not reciprocating her feelings and assumes they are having an extramarital affair. Anu and Arjun have a nasty quarrel, which ends with Arjun asking for divorce.

Back in the present, Arjun blames God for his current situation. So God gives Arjun a second chance to rectify the mistake with a golden ticket with three conditions - The ticket should stay with Arjun always, he should tell nobody about this ticket, and if at all he tells anyone about the ticket, he will die. Accepting the conditions, Arjun grabs the ticket and time travels to the night where he accepted Anu's marriage proposal.

This time, Arjun rejects Anu's proposal. Therefore, Anu decides to marry Matthew, the groom chosen by her father. Meanwhile, Arjun decides to pursue Meera, feeling that she is the right person for him. They strike a friendship, with Arjun removing all barriers which caused Meera's film-making attempts to fail in the original timeline. Arjun also decides to pursue acting as a career and Anu manages to convince his parents on the same. Meera soon starts to reciprocate Arjun's interest for her. Arjun also gets a chance to perform in audition for a film to be directed by Gautham Menon, and is selected for final audition to be held a month later. He goes to tell Paulraj about this news and gets into a deep conversation with him. Paulraj tells Arjun that he hails from a very backward village in Tirunelveli and his mother had died 50 years ago by snake bite, due to lack of toilets. He then left village as a teenager, with the mission of eradicating open defecation in his area. That led to him creating his latrine company and achieving his goal of bringing toilets to his native village. This revelation makes Arjun realise his mistake of ridiculing their business.

Anu learns that Arjun likes Meera and there is fair chance that Meera might reciprocate his love too. So Anu offers to help Arjun to propose Meera, asking him to make a video for Meera's upcoming birthday with wishes from Meera's family/friends and propose her at the end of the video. As a result, they go on a bike ride to Kerala, which is Meera's home state. By this time, through various instances, Arjun had started to realise how sweet and loving Anu is, and how supportive Anu's father was. During the trip, Arjun realises that he really loves Anu and that his interest towards Meera is just an infatuation. While on the Kerala trip, Arjun and Anu come across Meera's ex-boyfriend Krishna, who broke up with Meera to focus on his boxing career, however, he has also not gotten over her. Arjun decides to reunite Meera and Krishna instead and modifies the video accordingly. Meera reconciles with Krishna on her birthday after watching the video.

Arjun attends Anu's wedding with Matthew with a heavy heart. Unable to express his feelings for Anu, Arjun walks out of the church with Mani. At this juncture, they see Anu running out of the church without getting married. They meet her in their usual hangout pub, where she reveals her love for Arjun and also adds that she knew his feelings for her, hence she cancelled the wedding at the last minute. But Arjun again refuses to marry her as he does not want to hurt her again. When confronted by Anu and Mani, he blurts out about the second chance and the golden ticket. Immediately the ticket flies away from Arjun and in a bid to catch it, he gets hit by a lorry, killing him.

Arjun finds himself with God once again and pleads for one final chance; this time God states that no more final chances will be given to him and sends him away, asking him to take care of his own problems. Then Arjun realises that he is back in reality; on the day his divorce hearing is taking place. He rushes back to the court, where Anu is ready to give consent to the divorce. This time, Arjun refuses divorce and confesses his love to Anu. Anu accepts Arjun's love and reunites with him. It is revealed that God has given Arjun yet another chance and blesses him to go and live happily with Anu.

Cast 

 Ashok Selvan as Arjun Marimuthu, Anu's bestie turned her husband,
 Jay Adithya as young Arjun
 Ritika Singh as Anu Arjun (née Paulraj), Arjun's bestie turned wife (Voiceover by M. M. Manasi)
 Amrutha Dhivanand as young Anu
 Vani Bhojan as Meera, Arjun's senior crush in school and his ex-love interest
Sha Ra as Mani, Anu and Arjun's best friend
 Jagan as young Mani
 M. S. Bhaskar as Paulraj, Anu's father
Vijay Sethupathi as Kadavul (Extended Cameo Appearance)
Ramesh Thilak as Kadavul's Assistant 
 Gajaraj as Marimuthu, Arjun's father
 Sujatha Babu Ramesh as Arjun's mother
 Santhosh Prathap as Krishna, Meera's boyfriend, a boxer
 Abhishek Vinod as Mathew, Anu's ex-fiancé
 Aditi Dinesh as Swathi, Mani's wife
 Jagannath as young Mani
 Saranya as Krishna's sister
 Gautham Vasudev Menon as himself (Guest appearance)
 Seema as a Judge (Guest appearance)

Production 

The project was announced by newcomer Ashwath Marimuthu as his debut directorial venture. Vani Bhojan made her feature film acting debut through this project while Vijay Sethupathi was signed to play a cameo role. The first look poster was unveiled in September 2019 and the official teaser was unveiled in October 2019. In February 2020, Gautham Vasudev Menon was announced to be portraying a cameo role as himself. During the same month, the Telugu remake rights were claimed by PVP Cinema.

Soundtrack

The musical score and soundtrack were composed by Leon James, with the lyircs for the songs being written by Ko Sesha. The audio rights of the film, were secured by Sony Music India. The first single track from the film "Friendship Anthem" was released on 8 November 2019, at a private college event held in Chennai. The lyric video of the song features 1,000 photos of common people with their gang, accommodated in the song. In an interview, with Times of India, director Ashwath Marimuthu stated that, "The song features Ashok Selvan, Ritika Singh and Sha Ra, who have been friends for 16 years. But we have all those elements and memories that anybody can relate to. It has been a while since we had a song on friendship in Kollywood. We want this song to become the next Mustafa. I (Ashwath) hope the listeners enjoy it as much as we did."

The second single "Haiyo Haiyo" sung by Leon James, was released on 22 November 2019. Behindwoods rated the song 5.6 out of 10, stating "A good example of the pop genre, which is quite impressive", and was ranked in the 14th position in Best of Tamil Music, for the month of December 2019. The third single "Kadhaippoma" was released on 3 January 2020. Sung by Sid Sriram, the song received positive response from music listeners. With receiving a ranking in 10th position, on the Best of Tamil Music review from Behindwoods, with a rating of 6.3 out of 10, it stated "Sid Sriram delivers this sweet melody like a walk in the clouds. The flute and violin bits are very wonderfully interjected and maybe this song did deserve a higher position in the rankings." The fourth single "Ennada Life Idhu" sung by Santhosh Narayanan, was released on 29 January 2020.

The remaining two songs, were released along with the complete soundtrack album on 7 February 2020. The soundtrack received positive reviews from critics and music listeners. Sruthi Raman from The Times of India, gave a positive review for the album, in which "Kadhaipoma" as a perfect meet-cute song, in which Sid Sriram injects his characteristic charm in the song, which brims with beautiful acoustics. Reviewing for "Friendship Anthem", Raman stated "the song paints a nice picture of a long-standing friendship. The crisp song is rendered by Anirudh with peppy notes. Also tracing the friendship along with Anirudh in the song are Leon and MM Manasi." For "Ennada Life Idhu", Raman stated the song as a bright number by Santhosh Narayanan and Leon, ruing the complexities of life. Raman also stated "Kadhal Kozhappudhey begins with sharp tunes of jazz and goes on to shine in Sanjeev T's voice, which stands out with its conversational lyrics." She also reviewed about Haiyo Haiyo song in which Leon's voice sounds crisper in its remastered version.

Background score 

The original background score of the film was released on 26 February 2020. It features 30 original compositions from the film with two additional songs.

Release 
The film was scheduled to release on 14 February 2020, coinciding with Valentines Day, and received a U/A certificate from the Central Board of Film Certification after the director refused to cut a scene he felt was integral to the plot. The film's distribution rights were bought by Sakthi Film Factory. The film's Karnataka release rights were bought by Horizon Studios, and North India release rights were bought by Ganesh Films. Overseas rights of the film were bought by AP International. The Kerala rights of the film were acquired by E4 Entertainment, and was released in Kerala on 21 February 2020.

Marketing 
The first look posters of the film were released on 12 September 2019, and received positive responses from the audience. One of the famous WWE wrestler Kurt Angle's wife Giovanna Angle, shared the first look of this film. On 15 October 2019, another first look featuring Vani Bhojan was released. The official teaser of the film, was released by Vijay Sethupathi and Gautham Menon, who played cameo appearances in the film on 17 October 2019. The trailer of the film was unveiled on 31 January 2020.

Home media 
The satellite and digital broadcasting rights of the film were bought by Zee Network. The film had its digital premiere on Zee5, on 24 April 2020.

Reception 
The film received highly positive reviews for its innovative plot and great performances. The Times of India gave a rating of 3.5 out of 5, stating "Despite some conventional turns, Oh My Kadavule is a refreshing romance." Behindwoods rated 3 out of 5 stating, "Oh My Kadavule is an engaging romance with good performances and a solid element of surprise." India Today gave 3 out of 5 stars and stated "Director Ashwath Marimuthu's debut film Oh My Kadavule is an endearing romantic comedy that gives treats its characters with utmost respect." Indian Express gave 3 out of 5 stars to the film stating "This Ashok Selvan and Ritika Singh film largely works because of the fantasy spin and the fun treatment to the subject matter—but the writing is problematic." Sify gave 3.5/5 to the film stating it as "A breezy feel-good romantic entertainer." Indiaglitz gave 3 out of 5 stars to the film stating "Go for this breezy rom-com with a fantasy twist that is quite fresh."

Remake 
The film was remade in Telugu as Ori Devuda by Ashwath with Vishwak Sen, Mithila Palkar and Asha Bhat and featuring dialogues by Tharun Bhascker. The film was also remade in Kannada as Lucky Man with Darling Krishna and Puneeth Rajkumar.

Awards and Nominations

References

External links 
 

Indian romantic comedy films
2020 romantic comedy films
2020s Tamil-language films
2020 films
2020 directorial debut films
Indian fantasy comedy films
Tamil films remade in other languages